Ivory Coast competed at the 1984 Summer Olympics in Los Angeles, United States.  The nation returned to the Olympic Games after participating in the American-led boycott of the 1980 Summer Olympics.  Gabriel Tiacoh won Ivory Coast's first ever Olympic medal.

Medalists

Results by event

Athletics
Men's 400 metres 
 Gabriel Tiacoh
 Heat — 45.96
 Quarterfinals — 45.15
 Semifinals — 44.64
 Final — 44.54 (→  Silver Medal)

Boxing
Men's Bantamweight (54 kg)
Bararq Bahtobe
 First Round — Bye
 Second Round — Lost to Çemal Öner (Turkey), 1-4

References

External links
 

Ivory Coast
1984
Oly